Theodor Friedl (February 13, 1842 in Vienna – September 5, 1900 in Warth, Lower Austria) was an Austrian sculptor.

Biography
Friedl studied at the Academy of Fine Arts Vienna under Anton Dominik Fernkorn.  Among his first major commissions was a program of architectural sculpture for the 1877 Vienna Stock Exchange, a collaboration with the Danish-Austrian neo-classic architect Theophil Hansen.  The program included a quadriga, six full-figure statues, and a series of frieze panels around the cornice line.

The same year Friedl had also begun a long-term working relationship with Viennese architects Fellner & Helmer for theaters across Europe, transmitting variations of the Viennese neo-classic Ringstraße Style to Sofia, Brno, Berlin, etc.

Friedl was buried with honors at the Zentralfriedhof Cemetery, with a portrait relief on his tomb by sculptor Leopold Kosig.

Work 

Friedl's major work includes:

 Vienna Stock Exchange, for architect Theophil Hansen, 1877
 two finial Pegasus statues for the Stadttheater Augsburg, for Fellner & Helmer, 1877 (removed)
 Cupid and Psyche, marble, Belvedere, Vienna, 1882
 exterior and interior work at the Mahen Theatre, Brno, 1882, for Fellner & Helmer, 1882
 interior and exterior work, Municipal Theater of Karlovy Vary, for Fellner & Helmer, 1886
 pediment sculpture and all other facade sculpture, State Opera, Prague, for Fellner & Helmer and other architects, 1888
 Komische Oper Berlin, for Fellner & Helmer, 1892
 freestanding Horse Tamer statue, Maria-Theresien-Platz, 1893
 reliefs on the Liberec Town Hall, Liberec, Czech Republic, for architect Franz Neumann, 1893 
 ceiling reliefs in the Dutch Hall and Italian Hall, in the Palais Lanckoroński, Vienna, for Fellner & Helmer, 1895 (razed)

References

External links 
 Friedl's biographical entry in the Österreichisches Biographisches Lexikon 1815–1950 (German language)

1842 births
1900 deaths
Artists from Vienna
Academy of Fine Arts Vienna alumni
Austrian sculptors
Austrian male sculptors
Architectural sculptors
19th-century sculptors